Walter Bishop may refer to:

Walter Bishop Sr. (1905–1984), Jamaican composer and songwriter
Walter Bishop Jr. (1927–1998), American bop and hard bop jazz pianist, son of the above
Walter Bishop (Fringe), character in the television show Fringe